Stigma: Notes on the Management of Spoiled Identity is a 1963 book by Erving Goffman.

Goffman's book Stigma: Notes on the Management of Spoiled Identity (1963) examines how, to protect their identities when they depart from approved standards of behavior or appearance, people manage impressions of themselves, mainly through concealment. Stigma pertains to the shame a person may feel when he or she fails to meet other people's standards, and to the fear of being discredited—which causes the person not to reveal his or her shortcomings. Thus a person with a criminal record may simply withhold that information for fear of judgment by whomever that person happens to encounter.

An important concept within the book is passing whereby a person with a stigma blends in with normals by way of not disclosing personal attributes.

References

1963 non-fiction books
Sociology books
Books by Erving Goffman
Social stigma